are traditional Japanese mobile storage cabinets.  are commonly used for the storage of clothing, particularly kimono.

 were first recorded in the Genroku era (1688–1704) of the Edo period (1603–1867).

 are collectable, and many collectors focus on finding genuine antique . There are just a few workshops who produce  in imitation of the classic antiques, due to the high cost of materials and the very low prices of second-hand . Larger chests are sometimes reduced in size, particularly futon chests, step chests and other chests with deep drawers. Some reproduction  have been made in Korea using elm veneer.

Historical context

 were rarely used as stationary furniture. Consistent with traditional Japanese interior design, which featured a number of movable partitions, allowing for the creation of larger and smaller rooms within the home,  would need to be easily portable, and were not visible in the home except at certain times for specific situations.

Mobility was obtained through the use of attached wheels, iron carry handles or protruding structural upper rails for lifting.

Because the Edo period was feudal in its socio-economic structure, rules concerning the ownership of goods dominated all classes, from peasant to samurai. Travelling was regulated and conspicuous consumption discouraged through sumptuary laws.  from this time primarily reflect the class and occupation of the owner rather than any regionally inspired originality. With the coming of the Meiji Restoration of imperial authority in 1868, and the gradual disintegration of the rigid class structure, distinctive regional characteristics in  construction and design began to flourish.

Types

Edo period – class-determined 

During the Edo period (1603–1867), the type of  a person owned and used was largely determined by social class.

Meiji period – regional diversification 

During the Meiji period (1868–1911), the design of  developed further, seeing more regional diversification following the abolition of the feudal class system in Japan.

Other types

were used by the captain or owner of small coastal trading vessels licensed by the feudal shogunate to transport rice. These vessels would travel from the bountiful but remote countryside to the teeming cities on the  route between Osaka and Hokkaido through the Inland Sea and up the Japan Sea coast. With the enforced closure of the country in 1633 and a prohibition against the construction of ships with a keel, more than two masts and a cargo capacity exceeding  (2,550 bushels of rice) in 1636, the  inadvertently crippled the transport of rice grown on Japanese lands, resulting in shortages and even riots in some urban areas.

The problem was largely alleviated through reforms of the coastal navigation infrastructure and regulations suggested by Kawamura Zuiken in 1670. As well, he convinced the authorities to allow properly designated vessels to trade for their own account at coastal towns en route. Though most certainly an inducement to shipping traders, there was a physical constraint that stood in the way of  predictable success. The ships, though impressive in construction, were usually under  in length, with a scant crew of eleven or less. Coastal townspeople were not always impressed when these mariners arrived.

There is evidence that from the Kyōhō era of Edo (1716–1735), specific designs of elaborate cabinetry began to be used on the  route.

 evolved into three categories of design:

 : A seals and money chest with a single hinged door often covered by intricate iron plating, with multiple interior drawers or door covered compartments.
 : A clothing chest with a single drop-fit door. Often made as a set of two identical chests, designed so one could be placed on top of the other, then locked together.
 : A chest for accounting and writing related materials. Often rendered in many different configurations, some of which included the following features:
 : A drop-fit door cut into the case, used to hide a money box.
 : A small swinging door in the lower-right corner.
 : Double doors with half-faced hinges on the lower half of the box.
 : One or two drawers, exposed to the exterior.
 : Removable double sliding doors, running the full width of the box, appearing on the top third or middle third of the box.
 : Removable single sliding door in the lower half of the box, in the lower-left.

Types of hardware

Although decorative to the contemporary eye,  hardware remained largely functional through the Meiji period. Because the joinery of cases was simple and thus flexible to facilitate structural integrity during movement from place to place, hardware placement at vulnerable points was consistent with the need for reliability. Until the introduction of iron plate pressing from England in the 1880s, all iron for hardware was forged. With the introduction of Western technology,  hardware could now be easily made more decorative, with creative embellishments as well as functional ones.

 : Drawer or drawer-corner hardware, appearing at the corners of drawer faces. Generally these match their associated edge hardware.
 : A carrying handle, generally a loop appearing on the side near the top.
 : A different type of carrying loop, usually sliding, which was designed to hold a pole when used with its mate on the other side.
 : Lock jamb plate
 : Sliding-door lock
 : Vertical locking bar
 : Drawer pull
 : An "escutcheon", or flange, surrounding the contact point of a drawer pull.
 : Back plate for a drawer pull
 : Hinge
 : Staple affixing hardware to the wood
 : A single-action lock using a split spring for activation. For unlocking only.
 : A double-action lock mechanism of foreign origin dating from the 1860s.

Finishes
 finishes fall into two categories: dry and lacquered. For a dry finish, clay or chalk powder was rubbed into the soft wood surface (Paulownia, Cryptomeria or cypress) then burnished with an Eulalia root whisk. For lacquer (Rhus verniciflua), application could be only for sealing the plain wood to enhance a natural visible grain or for the creation of a perfect opaque surface.

See also
  (a preparation area in a Japanese tea house)
  (traditional japanese pantry)
 Miya Shoji
 Hoosier cabinet

References

Further reading
 
 Japanese Cabinetry: The Art and Craft of Tansu by David Jackson and Dane Owen, Gibbs-Smith Publisher 2002

External links

 Tansu Cabinetry—Tansu related articles by the author of Tansu: Traditional Japanese Cabinetry
 Kateigaho—Article detailing many features of tansu
 Stanford JGuide - Crafts & Antiques section—Many links to informational sources on tansu and related topics

Cabinets (furniture)
Clothing containers
Furniture
Japanese words and phrases
Japanese home
Portable furniture

ca:Calaixera
es:Cómoda
fr:Commode (meuble)
ja:箪笥